This is a list of unicorns in modern popular culture, chiefly literature, film and television, arranged chronologically:

 1871: Through the Looking-Glass by Lewis Carroll, features the nursery rhyme characters of "The Lion and the Unicorn."
1940 (November 13): Fantasia depicts unicorns and a unicorn donkey in the Pastoral Symphony segment of the film. 
 1940: Flash Gordon Conquers the Universe: Unicorns are seen being ridden by Princess Aura and Lady Sonja in the sixth chapter, "Flaming Death".
 1956 (March 15) Forbidden Planet makes reference to a virgin's ability to tame unicorns.
 1956 (September 4) The Last Battle, by C. S. Lewis, describes Jewel, a noble male unicorn who is King Tirian's best friend.
 1962: "The Unicorn" is a song by Shel Silverstein, best known in the 1968 recording by The Irish Rovers.
 1965: The Wandering Unicorn, a novel by the Argentinian Manuel Mujica Láinez features a magical unicorn's horn used as a lance during the Crusades.
 1965: Elidor by Alan Garner features a lost unicorn from another world.
 1968: The Last Unicorn, a worldwide best-selling novel by Peter S. Beagle, believes she is the last of her kind in the world and undertakes a quest to discover what has happened to the others.
 1976: Unico features a baby unicorn from Osamu Tezuka.
 1978 (November 19): Battlestar Galactica (1978 TV series): Unicorns are seen living on the planet Atilla in the episode "The Young Lords."
 1980-1990: Apprentice Adept is a heptalogy of fantasy and science fiction novels written by English American author Piers Anthony, and features unicorns as secondary characters of varying levels of importance. Includes Split Infinity (1980), Blue Adept (1981), Juxtaposition (1982), Out of Phaze (1987), Robot Adept (1988), Unicorn Point (1989), and Phaze Doubt (1990). 
 1981: Unicorn Variation, a novelette by Roger Zelazny, is about a chess game between a man and a unicorn in an abandoned bar.
 1982 (October 28): Tokimeki Tonight episode 4 features a unicorn pulling a carriage that the star family takes to the underworld. Two are also seen at the end of  episode 6 when an imaginary one is seen pulling a carriage carrying the two stars in wedding regalia, and then another appears tugging another pursuing carriage.
 1982 (November 19): The Last Unicorn, a film adaptation of the 1968 novel, features a unicorn on the cover.
 1983: Dungeons & Dragons features a unicorn called Uni.
 1983: My Little Pony features three unicorns known as Moondancer, Majesty, and Glory.
 1984: She-Ra: Princess of Power: She-Ra's horse turns into a unicorn during She-Ra's transformation.
 1985: Legend features a unicorn's horn being cut off by the villain.
 1985: In Hard-Boiled Wonderland and the End of the World by Haruki Murakami, the narrator learns to 'read' dreams from the skulls of unicorns.
 1985: Meredith Ann Pierce's Firebringer Trilogy features a society of speaking, multicolored unicorns.
 1987: The Care Bears Adventure in Wonderland: saving a unicorn is part of Alice's princess test.
 1987: The Real Ghostbusters: Unicorns are freed from a painting.
 1992: Blade Runner: in the director's cut, Rick Deckard has a dream of a unicorn. The meaning of the dream is central to his self-identity.
 1994-2010: The Unicorn Chronicles are a fantasy series by Bruce Coville, including Into the Land of the Unicorns (1994), Song of the Wanderer (1999), Dark Whispers (2008) and The Last Hunt (2010).
 1995-1996: Princess Gwenevere and the Jewel Riders includes a trio of girls who ride unicorns. The protagonist has a winged unicorn.
 1996: Kleo the Misfit Unicorn also features a wide cast of normal unicorns to complement the main character, who is a winged unicorn.
 1996: Pokémon Red and Blue, the Pokémon Rapidash is a unicorn with a mane made out of fire.
 1997: Harry Potter and the Philosopher's Stone a unicorn is injured and its blood is drunk.
 1998: Nico the Unicorn movie, based on the 1996 book by Frank Sacks.
 1999: "Gabriel Knight 3: Blood of the Sacred, Blood of the Damned" a unicorn is seen throughout the game, and represents the purity and holiness of the bloodline of Jesus Christ.
 2000 Fantasia 2000 A unicorn in Pomp And Circumstance, along with a dragon and a griffin, is laughing at all the other animals for going into Noah's ark.
 2001 (October 17): Zoo Tycoon video game Easter egg unicorn cheats exhibits.
 2001 (November 4): Harry Potter and the Philosopher's Stone (film), Lord Voldemort and Professor Quirrell are shown to be feeding off the blood of a dead unicorn.
 2002: The Twelve Kingdoms anime has "Qilin", the Chinese (mandarin) term for unicorns.
2005, 2015: Ricky Ricotta's Mighty Robot vs. the Uranium Unicorns from Uranus features an antagonist named Uncle Unicorn, as well as three unicorns that lived on Uranus and stayed there for so long, they mutated into uranium unicorns due to the toxic waste that was dumped everywhere on Uranus.
 2005 (May): Jack Frost (manhwa) features a very ugly unicorn.
 2005 (November 26): Charlie the Unicorn, a viral video first released on Newgrounds, features the eponymous unicorn Charlie as well as two other unicorns.
 2005 (December 8): The Chronicles of Narnia: The Lion, the Witch and the Wardrobe shows Peter riding a unicorn into battle.
 2006 (February): Mobile Suit Gundam Unicorn serial novel begins.
 2006 (March 17):  Wonder Pets!  features a baby unicorn in the season 1 episode "Save the Unicorn."
 2006 (March 20): The Elder Scrolls IV: Oblivion Sidequest.
 2006 (June 10): Sugar Sugar Rune anime episode 49 has a unicorn transformed into a boy in the final exam, Chocolat and Vanilla need to retrieve his horn.
 2007: Planet Unicorn features 3 unicorns named Feathers, Cadillac, and Tom Cruise.
 2007 (July 5): Noah's Ark features unnamed unicorn.
 2007 (August 10): Stardust features a unicorn coming to help out Yvaine the fallen star. 
She has the ability of flight and can shoot ice, wind, and lightning from her horn.
 2009 (February 24): The Princess and the Unicorn is a children's novel in which a unicorn is vital to the survival of a fairy community.
 2010 (February 4): Robot Unicorn Attack is a side-scrolling platform game in which the user controls the movement of a robotic unicorn. The object of the game is to prolong gameplay without falling off the stage, crashing into the edges of platforms, or colliding with crystal stars (without first dashing).
 2010 (June 18): Toy Story 3 features Buttercup.
 2010 (October 10): My Little Pony: Friendship is Magic features two unicorn protagonists, Twilight Sparkle and Rarity, along with many other unicorn characters in subsequent seasons.
 2011: Puella Magi Madoka Magica episode 9 features one alongside a mermaid.
 2012 (February 10): The Season 7, 14th episode of Supernatural, "Plucky Pennywhistle's Magical Menagerie" shows a unicorn chasing down a neglectful father and impaling him on its horn.
 2012 (March 9): The Cabin in the Woods depicts a unicorn killing a man by stabbing him through the chest
 2012 (April 22): Phoebe and her Unicorn webcomic series debuts
 2013 (April 30): The Fire Ascending from the series The Last Dragon Chronicles by Chris d'Lacey features an unnamed unicorn.
 2013 in the book, The Garden at the Roof of the World by W. B. J. Williams, Britomar, and Gwenaella (human) try to return to Eden to save the life of the unicorn who walked with Eve in paradise. 
 2013 (December 4): Lana Del Rey's short film Tropico features a unicorn along with other animals.
 2013 (June 25): Butt Stallion as a unicorn-like (it has two horns) character from the DLC "Tiny Tina's Assault on Dragon Keep" of Borderlands 2.
 2014 (October 24): Diomedes in Bayonetta 2 is a demon that looks similar to a unicorn, having a black horse-like body with a sword protruding out of its head instead of a horn.  “Unicorn horns” are also a collectible compound within the series.
 2015, in the cartoon Star vs. the Forces of Evil:
Star vs. the Forces of Evil episode 1b ("Party With a Pony", January 18): Flying Princess Pony Head, who is a floating unicorn head, is introduced.
Star vs. the Forces of Evil episode "Quest By": a unicorn on a treadmill is revealed to power Star's wand.
Star vs. the Forces of Evil episode 7b ("Sleep Spells", June 22): when Star paints a picture of her childhood, there is a purple unicorn in it.
 2015 (September 7): In the Gravity Falls episode "The Last Mabelcorn", unicorns appear, parodying those seen in The Last Unicorn. They are believed to be able to judge how "pure of heart" humans are, but this is revealed to be a scam they use to trick humans.
 2015: In the book Unicorn on a Roll by Dana Simpson, Marigold Heavenly Nostrils (a unicorn) and Phoebe (a human) have many fun adventures throughout the year.
 2016: The book series Melowy is released, featuring unicorns with wings.
 2017 (January 12): Hanazuki: Full of Treasures features unicorns that are from Kiyoshi's moon. Sleepy Unicorn and Twisted Unicorn are voiced by Avery Waddell while the others are voiced by Debi Derryberry.
 2018: In the Season 4 premiere of Legends of Tomorrow, the team finds a unicorn in the Woodstock Peace Rally that comes from hell. 
 2019 (February 22): In the series Corn & Peg, one of the main characters is Corn whose name is a play on the word unicorn.
 2019 (March 11): Filly Funtasia features unicorn fillies, including the main character, Rose.
 2020 (April 30): Unicorns are a sentient species in the indie game Them's Fightin' Herds.  Oleander, one of the game’s main characters, is a rebellious unicorn who formed a pact with a demon and uses dark magic to help fight, going against the traditional mindset of the rest of her clan who believes only light magic can be used for good.

See also
 Winged unicorn
 List of fictional horses

References

 
Unicorns

 
 
Legendary creatures in popular culture